The Stag's Head, Hoxton is a Grade II listed public house on Orsman Road, in the Hoxton area of Shoreditch, in London's East End.

It was built in 1936 for Truman's Brewery, and designed by their in-house architect A. E. Sewell.

It was Grade II listed in 2015 by Historic England.

See also
 List of pubs in London

References

Pubs in the London Borough of Hackney
Grade II listed pubs in London
Hoxton
Shoreditch